Marios Batis (alternate spelling: Mpatis) (born 20 June 1980) is a Greek former professional basketball player and current assistant coach. During his club playing career, at a height of is a 1.91 m (6'3") tall, he played at the point guard and shooting guard positions.

Professional career
After playing youth system basketball with the junior teams of the Greek club Faros Keratsiniou, Batis began his pro club career in the 1999–00 season, with Panionios Athens, where he competed in Greece's top-tier level Greek Basket League. With Panionios, he also competed in the now defunct European-wide secondary level competition, the FIBA Saporta Cup, in the 2001–02 season; and in the now defunct European-wide third level competition, the FIBA EuroCup Challenge, in the 2002–03 season. For the following 2003–04 season, he moved to the Greek first division club Irakleio Crete. 

After that, he played with Near East Athens, of the Greek 2nd Division, in the 2004–05 season. He spent the next two seasons with Ilysiakos Athens, of the Greek second division. He then played with Olympia Larissa for the next two seasons after that, where he competed in the Greek first division, and also in the now defunct European-wide third-tier level FIBA EuroChallenge competition, in the 2007–08 and 2008–09 seasons.

Batis spent the 2009–10 season with Maroussi Athens, where he played in the Greek first division, and also in the top-tier level European-wide competition, the EuroLeague. He then returned to the Greek club Panionios, where he played in the Greek first division, from 2010 to 2014. With Panionios, he also played in the European-wide secondary level competition, the EuroCup, in the 2012–13, and 2013–14 seasons. 

In 2014, Batis joined the Greek first division club Apollon Patras. He then moved to the senior team of Faros Keratsiniou of the Greek 2nd Division. He played with Faros Keratsiniou during the 2015–16 and 2016–17 seasons.

In 2017, Batis joined the Greek 3rd Division club Ionikos Nikaias. In the subsequent 2017–18 3rd Division and 2018–19 2nd Division seasons, he helped Ionikos Nikaias to achieve two consecutive league titles and promotions, as the club moved up from Greece's third division, to the highest-tier level of Greek pro club basketball, the Greek Basket League, for the 2019–20 season. He finished his club playing career in 2020, after playing with Megaridas, of the Greek 3rd Division.

Coaching career
Batis began working as a coach in 2020, when he became an assistant coach of the Greek Basket League club Ionikos Nikaias. In early 2021, he moved to AEK Athens, serving under head coaches Vangelis Angelou, Stefanos Dedas and Curro Segura. In July 2022, Batis parted ways with AEK.

References

External links
Euroleague.net Profile
FIBA Europe Profile
ProBallers.com Profile
Eurobasket.com Profile
Draftexpress.com Profile
Greek Basket League Profile 
Greek Basket League Profile 

1980 births
Living people
AEK B.C. coaches
Apollon Patras B.C. players
Faros Keratsiniou B.C. players
Greek basketball coaches
Greek men's basketball players
Ilysiakos B.C. players
Ionikos Nikaias B.C. players
Ionikos Nikaias B.C. coaches
Irakleio B.C. players
Maroussi B.C. players
Near East B.C. players
Olympia Larissa B.C. players
Panionios B.C. players
Point guards
Shooting guards
Basketball players from Piraeus